General elections were held in Turkey on 12 October 1969. The electoral system used was party-list proportional representation using the D'Hondt method in 66 electoral districts. The result was a victory for the Justice Party, which won 256 of the 450 seats. Voter turnout was 64.3%.

Results

References

General elections in Turkey
Turkey
Turkey
General